A Song from Days of Youth is a 1925 German silent film directed by Franz Osten and starring Maria Mindzenty, John Mylong and Ferdinand Martini.

The film's sets were designed by the art director Willy Reiber. It was shot at the Emelka Studios in Munich.

Cast
 Maria Mindzenty as Anna Tjomsen
 John Mylong as Jürg Asmussen
 Ferdinand Martini as Schuster Asmussen
 Toni Wittels as seine Frau
 Waldemar Potier as Klein-Jürgen
 Loni Nest as Klein-Anna
 Georg H. Schnell as Graf Tessing
 Claire Harten as Gräfin Tessing
 Manfred Koempel-Pilot as ihr Sohn, Axel
 Patric Gehring as Klein-Axel
 Lilian Gray as Elinor Wilzin
 Ernst Schrumpf as ihr Vater

References

Bibliography
 John Holmstrom. The moving picture boy: an international encyclopaedia from 1895 to 1995. Michael Russell, 1996.

External links

1925 films
Films of the Weimar Republic
German silent feature films
Films directed by Franz Osten
Bavaria Film films
Films shot at Bavaria Studios
German black-and-white films
1920s German films